Alien Breed II: The Horror Continues is a run and gun video game, the sequel to Alien Breed. It was released in 1993 by Team17 for the Amiga, available in both OCS/ECS and AGA versions. The AGA version of the game was also included as an extra in the Amiga CD32 version of Alien Breed: Tower Assault.

The game engine for Alien Breed II was largely rewritten to allow smoother scrolling between screens (the code for which was carried over to another Team17 project, Superfrog, a 2D platform game). The graphics were also vastly improved, as were the size and number of levels (there are 17 in AB-II compared to 6 in Alien Breed and 12 in Alien Breed Special Edition 92). The difficulty curve for AB-II is also steeper than that of its predecessor.

Alien Breed II is the only game in the series that gives players the option of choosing between four characters, each with their own specific strengths and weaknesses.

References

1993 video games
Alien Breed
Amiga games
Amiga 1200 games
Amiga-only games
Amiga CD32 games
Cooperative video games
Run and gun games
Science fiction video games
Video game sequels
Video games developed in the United Kingdom
Video games scored by Allister Brimble